The Stearman C1 (or Stearman Sport Commercial Model 1) was the first type of airplane manufactured by the Stearman Aircraft Corporation. Only one example was manufactured, at the original Stearman factory in Venice, California, flying for the first time in March 1927.

Design and development 
The aircraft was a sesquiwing type of biplane with its fuselage frame manufactured from thin-walled steel tubing. The wings had spruce spars. The aircraft had two tandem open cockpits with the pilot in the aft cockpit and two passengers in the forward cockpit. Ailerons were installed on the upper wings only. Brakes were a standard installation.

It was initially powered by a   Curtiss OX-5 liquid-cooled engine but was later fitted with a   French Salmson 9Z water cooled radial engine and redesignated as the model C1X.

C1
Biplanes
Single-engined tractor aircraft
Aircraft first flown in 1927